Horqin Right Middle Banner is a banner in the east of Inner Mongolia, China, bordering Jilin province to the east. It is under the administration of Hinggan League. The local Mongolian dialect is Khorchin Mongolian. The banner spans an area of 15,613 square kilometers in area, and has a population of 207,380 as of 2020.

Name 
"Horqin" in Mongolian translates to "archer". The area was also historically known as the Tushiyetu Banner and the Ke Right Middle Banner.

Geography 
It borders Horqin Right Front Banner and Tuquan County to the north, Tongyu County and Taonan in Jilin Province to the east, Horqin Left Middle Banner to the south, and Jarud Banner, Huolinguole and East Ujimqin Banner to the west.

Climate 
The average annual temperature is 5.6 °C, and the annual precipitation is typically between 350 and 400 mm.

History 
A segment of the  runs through the banner. The Jin Dynasty city of Tuliemao was located in the banner, and its ruins of the city still exist within the banner.

Horqin Right Middle Banner was established in 1636.

Administrative divisions 
The banner is divided into 6 towns, 6 sums, 1 township-level ranch, 1 township-level farm, and 2 township-level mines. These township-level divisions are then further divided into 173 gaqa and 464 aili.

Towns 

Sums 

Other township-level divisions 
In addition to towns and sums, Horqin Right Middle Banner administers a number of special areas with township-level designation.

Budunhua Ranch 

Tuliemaodu Farm 

Meng'entaoligai Mine Work Unit 

Budunhua Mine Work Unit 

Demographics 
The banner has a population of 255,494 people, hailing from 14 different ethnic groups. The ethnic Mongolian population is dominant in the banner, accounting for 86.6% of the total population, the highest proportion of any banner.

Economy 
As of 2016, the banner's GDP totaled 6.596 billion Yuan, government revenue totaled 232 million Yuan, urban per capita disposable income reached 21,700 Yuan, and rural per capita disposable income reached 7,904 Yuan.

The banner's main mineral deposits include gold, tin, copper, iron, lead, zinc, coal, rare earth minerals, perlite, and quartz.

Transportation 
The  passes through the banner, as does National Highway 110.

References

Banners of Inner Mongolia